Joseph Frank D'Orsie is an American politician who has represented the 47th District in the Pennsylvania House of Representatives as a Republican since 2023.

Early life
D'Orsie was born in York County, Pennsylvania, and was raised in Dallastown. He graduated from Dallastown Area High School and later earned a Bachelor of Arts degree in public relations from Duquesne University. In 2012, D'Orsie served with Youth with a Mission as a missionary in the Dominican Republic. From 2016 to 2022, he was communications director at Praise Community Church, an affiliate of the Church of God (Cleveland, Tennessee).

Political career
In 2022, D'Orsie defeated incumbent Pennsylvania State Representative Keith Gillespie in a Republican primary challenge, and went on to win the general election to represent the 47th District unopposed.

D'Orsie is a member of the Pennsylvania State Freedom Caucus.

In 2023, D'Orsie announced plans to draft a bill that would repeal Pennsylvania's automatic gas tax increase.

Personal life
D'Orsie lives in Mount Wolf, Pennsylvania, with his wife, Adrienne, and their two children.

Electoral history

References

Living people
Republican Party members of the Pennsylvania House of Representatives
21st-century American politicians
People from York County, Pennsylvania
Year of birth missing (living people)